Siim Luts (born 12 March 1989) is an Estonian professional footballer who plays as a left winger for Paide Linnameeskond.

Club career

Flora
Luts began playing football at Flora youth academy in Paide. He made his Flora – and Meistriliiga – debut on 4 October 2008, coming on as a 72nd-minute substitute for Sergei Mošnikov in a 1–1 draw against Tallinna Kalev at A. Le Coq Arena. Luts scored his first Meistriliiga goal on 1 November 2008, in a 4–2 home win over TVMK. In July 2009, he joined Tulevik on loan until the end of the season.

Luts became a regular starter for Flora in the 2010 season, in which he scored 6 goals in 31 games and won his first Meistriliiga title. He won his second Meistriliiga title in the 2011 season.

IFK Norrköping
On 22 January 2013, Luts signed a two-year contract with Allsvenskan club IFK Norrköping. On 4 April 2013, his missed penalty in the shoout-out against Djurgårdens IF saw IFK Norrköping eliminated in the quarter-finals of the 2012–13 Svenska Cupen. Luts made his debut in the Allsvenskan on 8 April 2013, in a 2–1 home victory over Gefle IF. He made 13 league appearances in the 2013 season. After missing first half of the season due to injury, Luts was released by the club in June 2014.

Levadia
On 16 January 2015, Luts signed a one-year contract with Meistriliiga club Levadia. He made his debut for Levadia on 3 March 2015, against Santos in the Estonian Supercup, winning the match 5–0.

Bohemians 1905
On 25 July 2016, Luts signed a two-year contract with Czech First League club Bohemians 1905. He made his debut in the Czech First League on 31 July 2016, in a 0–3 home loss to Hradec Králové.

Teplice
On 23 May 2018, it was announced that Luts would join Czech First League club Teplice after the 2017–18 season on a two-year deal.

Paide Linnameeskond
On 19 July 2019, Luts signed a two-and-a-half-year contract with Paide Linnameeskond.

International career
Luts began his youth career in 2007 with the Estonia under-19 team. He also represented the under-21, and under-23 national sides.

Luts made his senior international debut for Estonia on 17 November 2010, replacing Tarmo Kink in the 76th minute of a 1–1 home draw against Liechtenstein in a friendly. His first goal for Estonia on 7 June 2014, in a 2–1 friendly victory over Tajikistan, brought him the Estonian Silverball award for the best goal scored for the national team in 2014.

On 28 March 2017, Luts scored his second international goal after just 58 seconds in a 3–0 friendly victory over Croatia.

Career statistics

Club

International

International goals
As of 15 October 2018. Estonia score listed first, score column indicates score after each Luts goal.

Honours

Club
Flora
Meistriliiga: 2010, 2011
Estonian Cup: 2010–11
Estonian Supercup: 2009, 2011, 2012

Levadia
Estonian Supercup: 2015

Individual
Estonian Silverball: 2014, 2018

References

External links

1989 births
Living people
Sportspeople from Paide
Estonian footballers
Association football midfielders
Paide Linnameeskond players
Esiliiga players
Meistriliiga players
FC Flora players
Viljandi JK Tulevik players
FCI Levadia Tallinn players
Allsvenskan players
IFK Norrköping players
Czech First League players
Bohemians 1905 players
FK Teplice players
Estonia youth international footballers
Estonia under-21 international footballers
Estonia international footballers
Estonian expatriate footballers
Estonian expatriate sportspeople in Sweden
Expatriate footballers in Sweden
Estonian expatriate sportspeople in the Czech Republic
Expatriate footballers in the Czech Republic